Heinrich Georg Winter (1 October 1848,  Leipzig – 16 August 1887) was a German mycologist.

Beginning in 1870, he studied natural sciences at the Universities of Leipzig, Munich and Halle, obtaining his habilitation in 1875 from the Polytechnic Confederation in Zurich.

He is the taxonomic authority of Sordariaceae, a family of perithecial fungi. In 1880 he described the order Ustilaginales (smut fungi). He also conducted anatomical and morphological research of crustose lichens.

From 1871 to 1879, he was co-editor of the journal "Hedwigia", from 1879 until his death, he served as its editor. With Anton de Bary and Heinrich Rehm, he was co-author of Die Pilze Deutschlands, Oesterreichs und der Schweiz.

References 

1848 births
1887 deaths
Scientists from Leipzig
Leipzig University alumni
Ludwig Maximilian University of Munich alumni
University of Halle alumni
German mycologists